Muskogee or Muscogee can refer to:
Muscogee, or Muscogee Creek, a Native American people of the southeastern woodlands
Muscogee (Creek) Nation, a federally recognized Muscogee tribe in Oklahoma
Muscogee language, a language spoken by some Muscogee and Seminole
Muskogean languages, a language family including Muscogee
Muscogee, Florida, a ghost town
Muskogee, Oklahoma, a city
Muscogee County, Georgia
Muskogee County, Oklahoma
State of Muskogee, a nation declared by William Augustus Bowles in 1799

Language and nationality disambiguation pages